Di Brandt (born 31 January 1952) (née Janzen) often stylized as di brandt, is a Canadian poet and scholar from Winnipeg, Manitoba. She became Winnipeg's first Poet Laureate in 2018.

Life and career

Brandt grew up in Reinland, a Mennonite farming village in southern Manitoba near Winkler. Her first volume of poetry questions i asked my mother was published by Turnstone Press in 1987. Since then she has published seven more volumes of poetry, as well as literary criticism. Brandt has degrees from the University of Manitoba and University of Toronto and has also taught Canadian literature and creative writing. She was poetry editor at Prairie Fire Magazine and Contemporary Verse 2 during the 1980s and 90s.  She also served as Manitoba and Prairie Rep at the League of Canadian Poets National Council and the Writers' Union of Canada National Council. In 2018, she became the first Poet Laureate of Winnipeg, a position she held through 2019, and was awarded an Honorary Doctorate by MacEwan University in 2021.

Bibliography

Poetry:
questions i asked my mother (Winnipeg: Turnstone Press, 1987)
Agnes in the sky (Winnipeg: Turnstone Press, 1990)
mother, not mother (Toronto: The Mercury Press, 1992)
Jerusalem, beloved (Winnipeg: Turnstone Press, 1995)
Now You Care (Toronto: Coach House Press, 2003)
The Lottery of History (Brandon, MB:  Radish Press, 2008).  Chapbook.
Walking to Mojacar, with French and Spanish translations by Charles Leblanc and Ari Belathar (Winnipeg: Turnstone Press, 2010)
SHE: Poems inspired by Laozi, with ink drawings by Lin Xu (Brandon, MB:  Radish Press, 2012). Chapbook.
The Sweetest Dance on Earth: New and Selected Poems (Winnipeg: Turnstone Press, 2022)

Essays:
Wild Mother Dancing:  Maternal Narrative in Canadian Literature (Winnipeg, MB:   University of Manitoba Press 1993).
Dancing Naked:  Narrative Strategies for Writing Across Centuries (Toronto:  Mercury Press 1996).
Re:Generations:  Canadian Women Poets in Conversation (Windsor, ON:  Black Moss Press 2006), ed. with Barbara Godard.
So this is the world & here I am in it (Edmonton: NeWest Press 2007).
Wider Boundaries of Daring:  The Modernist Impulse in Canadian Women's Poetry (Waterloo, ON:  Wilfrid Laurier University Press 2011), ed. with Barbara Godard.

Collaborations:
Awakenings:  In Four Voices, a collaborative poetry/music audiorecording (CD) with Dorothy Livesay (posthumously), Carol Ann Weaver and Rebecca Campbell (2003).
Emily, The Way you Are, a one-woman chamber opera about the life and work of Emily Carr, with musical score by Jana Skarecky, premiered at the McMichael Gallery in Kleinburg, ON, in 2011, featuring mezzo-soprano Ramona Carmelly and the Talisker Players directed by Gary Kulesha.
Watermelon Syrup:  A Novel with Annie Jacobsen and Jane Finlay-Young (WLUP 2011).
Coyotes do not carry her away, a musical setting of Di Brandt's poems, by Manitoba composer Kenneth Nichols, commissioned by the Brandon Chamber Society and premiered at Brandon City Hall in 2012, featuring Naomi Forman (soprano), Catherine Wood (clarinet) and Ann Germani (harp).

Awards and recognition
 Gerald Lampert Award for "best first book of poetry in Canada," for questions i asked my mother.
 McNally Robinson Manitoba Book of the Year Award for Agnes in the sky.
 CAA National Poetry Prize for Jerusalem, beloved.
 Foreword Gold Medal for Fiction for Watermelon Syrup.
 Gabrielle Roy Prize for "best book of literary criticism in Canada," with Barbara Godard, for Wider Boundaries of Daring:  The Modernist Impulse in Canadian Women's Poetry.
 Brandon University President's Medal for Research, Teaching and Service 2011.
 Canada Research Chair in Literature and Creative Writing, Brandon University, 2005–2011.
 SSHRC Research Fellow, University of Alberta, 1996–1998.
 Research Excellence Award, University of Windsor, 2006.
 Gold Medal for Exceptional Service to Brandon University, 2009.
 Research Fellow, Ledig House, New York, 2004.
 Research Fellow, Hawthornden Castle, Scotland, 1999.
 Research Fellow, Chateau de Lavigny, Switzerland, 2001.
 Research Fellow, Fundacion Valparaiso, Spain, 2006.
 Governor General's Award for Poetry nomination, for questions i asked my mother.
 Governor General's Award for Poetry nomination, for Jerusalem, beloved.
 Griffin Poetry Prize 2004 shortlist, for Now You Care.
 Trillium Ontario Book of the Year Award for Now You Care.
 Pat Lowther Award for "best book of poetry by a Canadian woman, nomination, for mother, not mother.
 Pat Lowther Award nomination, for Jerusalem, beloved.
 Pat Lowther Award nomination, for Now You Care. 
 McNally Robinson Manitoba Book of the Year Award nomination, for So this is the world & here I am in it.
 McNally Robinson Manitoba Book of the Year Award nomination, for Wild Mother Dancing:  Maternal Narrative in Canadian Literature.
 McNally Robinson Manitoba Book of the Year Award nomination, for Walking to Mojacar, with French and Spanish translations by Charles Leblanc and Ari Belathar.

See also

Canadian literature
Canadian poetry
List of Canadian poets
List of Canadian writers

References

External links 
 Di Brandt 's  entry in The Canadian Encyclopedia
 Griffin Poetry Prize biography 
 Griffin Poetry Prize reading, including video clip 
 Mennonite Voices in Poetry
 Giessener Elektronische Bibliothek: Julia Michael, Narrating communities: constructing and challenging Mennonite Canadian identities through narrative, thesis Universität Gießen 2017, therein Deconstructing Images of Motherhood in Di Brandt's "Mother, not mother", pp. 157–173

1952 births
20th-century Canadian poets
21st-century Canadian poets
Canadian Mennonites
Canadian women poets
Canada Research Chairs
Living people
Mennonite writers
Mennonite poets
People from Winkler, Manitoba
University of Manitoba alumni
University of Toronto alumni
Writers from Winnipeg
20th-century Canadian women writers
21st-century Canadian women writers
Poets Laureate of places in Canada